Commission on Accreditation of Allied Health Education Programs, (or CAAHEP), is an accreditation agency for postsecondary education programs in 30 health science fields.

Programmatic accreditation is granted after an education program is reviewed and it is determined that the program is in compliance with the profession's accreditation Standards. A not-for-profit organization, CAAHEP is recognized by the Council for Higher Education Accreditation (CHEA). It is based in Clearwater, Florida.

Members and leadership 

CAAHEP's members are organizations that represent the professions accredited by CAAHEP and/or the institutions that teach CAAHEP accredited programs.
CAAHEP's leadership is composed of both a Commission and a Board of Directors.

The individuals who serve as Commissioners are representatives from CAAHEP's sponsoring organizations, along with a recent graduate of a CAAHEP accredited program and members of the general public.  The Commissioners approve the organization's mission, vision, and bylaws, and decide which health science professions qualify to take part in the CAAHEP accreditation system.  CAAHEP is also led by a Board of Directors, whose members are elected from among the Commissioners. When an education program in a health science profession seeks CAAHEP accreditation, the program will work with that profession's Committee on Accreditation (CoA).

Brief History 

In 1904, the American Medical Association established its Council on Medical Education (CME). The CME developed a rating system of medical schools in 1905, initiated inspections in 1906, and classified the institutions in 1907. The AMA then collaborated with the Carnegie Foundation to conduct a study of the quality of medical education that resulted in the Flexner Report in 1910. These early efforts subsequently led to the development of specialized accreditation for the education of health professionals. It was also the precursor of accreditation activities for most other professional associations.

Early in the 1930s, several national bodies requested the collaboration of the AMA in establishing accreditation for education programs in their areas of interest. These early efforts established a basis and pattern for the role of the AMA in collaborating with other national associations for the accreditation of health sciences education programs. From 1935 through 1976, the recognized agency was the AMA Council on Medical Education. In 1976 the CME delegated to the newly formed Committee on Allied Health Education and Accreditation (CAHEA) the responsibility and authority for health sciences education accreditation. In October, 1992 the AMA announced its intent to support the establishment of a new and independent agency to assume the accreditation responsibilities of CAHEA

Programs Accredited by CAAHEP

CAAHEP accredits over 2,200 programs in 28 health science disciplines. The programs reside in more than 1,300 postsecondary educational institutions across the United States and Canada.

Accredited Professions

by CAAHEP the professions are
Advanced Cardiovascular Sonography
Anesthesia Technician/Technologist
Anesthesiologist Assistant
Art Therapist
Assistive Technology
Cardiovascular Technologist
Clinical Research Professional
Cytotechnologist
Diagnostic Medical Sonographer
Emergency medical services
Exercise Physiology
Exercise Science
Intraoperative Neurophysiologic Monitoring
Kinesiotherapist
Lactation Consultant
Medical Assistant
Medical Illustrator
Orthoptic Fellowship Programs
Orthotic and Prosthetic Technician
Orthotic/Prosthetic Assistant
Orthotist and Prosthetist
Pedorthist 
Perfusionist
Personal Fitness Trainer
Polysomnographic Technologist
Recreational Therapy
Inclusive Rehabilitation Sciences
Respiratory Care 
Specialist in Blood Banking Technology
Surgical Assistant
Surgical Technologist

See also 

Allied Health Professions
Educational Accreditation
List of Recognized Accreditation Associations of Higher Learning

References

External links 
 Commission on Accreditation of Allied Health Education Programs- Official Website
Committees on Accreditation Roster
"CAAHEP Accreditation Manual," CAAHEP revised 2016, pp.6, Clearwater, FL
Search listing of CAAHEP accredited programs

School accreditors
Allied health professions-related professional associations
Health education in the United States